Line of succession to the French throne may refer to:

 Line of succession to the French throne (Bonapartist)
 Line of succession to the French throne (Orléanist)